Donald George Seymour (16 March 1916 – 23 July 1986) was an Australian rules footballer who played with Footscray in the Victorian Football League (VFL).	

Seymour was recruited to Footscray from the Albury Football Club in the Ovens & Murray Football League and won the Footscray Reserves best and fairest award in both 1938 and 1939. He made two appearances in the Footscray senior team, both in 1939.

Seymour was also a professional athletic foot-runner who ran in the Stawell Gift.	

Seymour served in the Australian Army during World War II from 1940 to 1945 and also played with the South Sydney Football Club during these years.

Notes

External links 
		

1916 births
1986 deaths
Western Bulldogs players
Australian Army personnel of World War II
Australian rules footballers from Albury
Military personnel from New South Wales